Spencer Town Hall and Fire Station is a historic town hall and fire station located at Spencer, Owen County, Indiana.  It was built in 1897–1898, and is a two-story, rectangular, Romanesque Revival style limestone building with a corner bell tower.  It measures 24 feet wide and 61 feet long and has a hipped roof.  The building was used for municipal purposes until 1975. In 2005, the building housed law offices.

It was listed on the National Register of Historic Places in 1982.

References

City and town halls on the National Register of Historic Places in Indiana
Romanesque Revival architecture in Indiana
Government buildings completed in 1898
Buildings and structures in Owen County, Indiana
National Register of Historic Places in Owen County, Indiana
Fire stations on the National Register of Historic Places in Indiana
Fire stations on the National Register of Historic Places in New York (state)
1898 establishments in Indiana